Dr. Sofyan A. Djalil, S.H., M.A., M.A.L.D. was the  Minister of Agrarian and Spatial Planning of Indonesia under President Joko Widodo's 2014–2019 Working Cabinet and the Onward Indonesia Cabinet. He has served as State Minister for State-Owned Enterprises Indonesia at United Indonesia Cabinet.

From October 2004 to May 2007 he served as Minister of Communication and Information Technology in the same cabinet. From 26 October 2014 to 12 August 2015, he was elected as Coordinating Ministers for Economic Affairs Indonesia in the Working Cabinet 2014-2019 period by President Jokowi, he was then replaced by Darmin Nasution in the reshuffle of Working Cabinet. He then served as Minister of National Development Planning or Head of Bapennas from 12 August 2015 to 27 July 2016 on Working Cabinet and was replaced by Bambang Brodjonegoro in the second cabinet reshuffle.

References

See also
List of longest-serving ministers in Indonesia

1953 births
Living people
Indonesian Muslims
People from East Aceh Regency
Onward Indonesia Cabinet